The 2015 Tennessee Tech Golden Eagles football team represented Tennessee Technological University as a member of Ohio Valley Conference (OVC) during the 2015 NCAA Division I FCS football season. Led by Watson Brown in his ninth and final season as head coach, the Golden Eagles compiled an overall record of 4–7 overall with a mark of 3–5 in conference play, placing sixth in the OVC. Tennessee Tech played home games at Tucker Stadium in Cookeville, Tennessee.

The game against Eastern Kentucky originally scheduled for October 10 was played two days earlier at Toyota Stadium in Georgetown, Kentucky due to campus safety concerns in the wake of threatening graffiti in a campus restroom and other threats allegedly made over social media.

On December 2, head coach Brown announced his retirement. He his tenure at finished at Tennessee Tech with a nine-year record of 42–60.

Schedule

References

Tennessee Tech
Tennessee Tech Golden Eagles football seasons
Tennessee Tech Golden Eagles football